Sar Tappeh (also known as Sar Tappeh-ye Soflá and Deh Tappeh) is a village in Shirvan Rural District, in the Central District of Borujerd County, Lorestan Province, Iran. At the 2006 census, its population was 54, in 15 families.

References 

Towns and villages in Borujerd County